James Baily (born 1 February 1975) is a British former professional tennis player who won the boys' singles title at the 1993 Australian Open.

Biography
Born in Portsmouth, Baily is originally from Curbridge, a village in Hampshire.

At the 1993 Australian Open, a day before his 18th birthday, Baily defeated New Zealander Steven Downs in the boys' singles final. This made him the first British player in 28 years to win a junior grand slam title, since Gerald Battrick in 1965.

Bailey, who was coached by Steve Shaw, couldn't make the transition to professional tennis and appeared only in satellite tournaments, before retiring in 1994.

Junior Grand Slam finals

Singles: 1 (1 title)

References

External links
 
 

1975 births
Living people
British male tennis players
English male tennis players
Tennis people from Hampshire
Australian Open (tennis) junior champions
Grand Slam (tennis) champions in boys' singles
20th-century British people
21st-century British people